Savala is a village and seat of Lüganuse Parish, Ida-Viru County in northeastern Estonia.

References
 

Villages in Ida-Viru County
Lüganuse Parish